Kamassian is an extinct Samoyedic language. It is included by convention in the Southern group together with Mator and Selkup (although this does not constitute a subfamily). The last native speaker of Kamassian, Klavdiya Plotnikova, died in 1989. Kamassian was spoken in Russia, north of the Sayan Mountains, by Kamasins. The last speakers lived mainly in the village of Abalakovo. Prior to its extinction, the language was strongly influenced by Turkic languages.

The term Koibal is used as the ethnonym for the Kamas people who shifted to the Turkic Khakas language. The modern Koibal people are mixed Samoyed–Khakas–Yeniseian. The Kamassian language was documented by Kai Donner in his trips to Siberia along with other Samoyedic languages. But the first documentation attempts started in the 1740s. In 2016 the university of Tartu published a Kamassian e-learning book. The grammar and vocabulary of Kamassian are well documented.

History 
The Kamasins have never been a large group, and they lived a nomadic life, living next to Turkic and Yeniseian tribes. In the middle of the 17th century Sayan Samoyeds started to assimilate into Turkic peoples and Kamassian was the only one to survive until investigators came, such as Castrén and Kai Donner. Due to many hardships in Russia Kai Donner was sure that he will be the last one to investigate the Kamassian language before it went extinct, already in the middle of the 20th century it was thought Kamass had died. However it was later found there was still one speaker of Kamassian left: Klavdiya Plotnikova. The Kamassian speakers also assimilated into the Russians, in the 20th century half of the Kamass people were born to Russian mothers which caused much influence to come from the Russian language. After the Russian Civil War the Kamassian language started to fall drastically.

Dialects 
Kamassian had two dialects: Kamassian (also known as Kamass) and Koibal. However, the Koibal dialect is very poorly documented and only about 600 words of it are known. The Kamass dialect also had two sub-dialects, "Fat" and "Eagle", which mainly differed in phonology. The Eagle dialect was the most dominant Kamass dialect

Phonology 
The phonological account of Kamassian is very basic, due to unclear data labeling by K.Donner and Castren. It is uncertain whether Kamassian had primary vowel length, consonant gemination, and palatal stops or affricates as different phonemes. It varied widely between speakers. However, there are audio recordings of the last native speaker.

Kamassian has both palatalized and palatal phonemes.

Consonantshttps://www.infuse.finnougristik.uni-muenchen.de/e-learning/kamas/o1_kamas.pdf  

*the affricates may just be consonant clusters

**ɣ seems to have been an allophone of g for some speakers.

K.Donner also mentioned a sound  and an f sound that was used in loanwords. Kamassian also had aspiration.

Phonotactics 
The maximal syllable structure is CVCC. The only type of cluster allowed, in the coda, is ʔC. An example of this would be naʔb (duck).

Palatalization only occurs in front of vowels.

Three consonants do not occur word initially: the trill r, the velar nasal, and the glottal stop.

Variations 
The last Kamassian speakers had some variations in their speech and a few vowels and consonants were slightly different depending on the speaker, for example:

oo ~ ee

ə ~ ɯ

x ~ k͔´

b ~ β (w)

Examples of Kamassian 
(examples in the UPA script)
 daγaibə sēləbiə̑m, sēlənnə p͑im bɯn ɯštəbiəm.
 i sharpened my knife, i dropped the sharpening stone into the water
 
 ťăbaktǝrla’bǝm ĭmbi popalo
 i tell what has happened
 
 dĭgǝttǝ măna kumbii’ kazān turānǝ
 Then they took me to Aginskoe
 
 dĭn măna kros embii’
 there they put a cross to me

Examples of the Koibal dialect 
 timɛzǝt = toothless
 sagǝssǝt = mindless
 amnuzǝt = hornless

Basic phrases 

 Kăde tănan kăštəliaʔi? = what is your name 
 măna kăštəbiʔi = my name is
 pasiba = thank you
 Dărowă/zdărowă = hello
 naga = isn't
 jakšə = good
 ej = no

Grammar 
Kamassian is an agglutinative language and it has many flective markers.

Kamassan had 7 cases: Nominative -Ø, Genitive, -(ǝ)n, Accusative -(ǝ)m, Lative/Dative -n(ǝ) ~ -dǝ ~ -tǝ, Locative -Kǝn ~ -gǝn, Ablative -gǝʔ ~ -kǝʔ and Instrumental źəʔ ~ -śəʔ. And the plural endings are: -zaŋ ~ -zeŋ ~ -saŋ ~ -seŋ. However, there are a few irregularities : ešši 'child', esseŋ 'children', bulan 'moose' and genetive "bulaan".

Verbs 
There are three tenses and moods in Kamassian: Conditional, Imperative, Future, Present tense, Past tense and Optative.

The Conditional is formed by -na ~ -ne after vowels and -ta ~ -te ~ -da ~ -de after consonants. The second component is -ze which comes after the personal ending.

kandamze 'I would go'.

 Imperative is done by adding -ʔ or -Kǝ.
 Optative ending is  -š(ti) in the singular and -Šǝ in the plural and dual.
 The past tense is done by adding -BiA 1st and 2nd person singular  or -Bi in others.
 The future tense is marked with  -LA. 
 
Negatives

In Kamassian a verb is made negative by adding the word "e ~ i" with the main verb. Examples with the word šo- 'come':

 ej šoliam = i don't come
 ej šolial = you don't come
 ej šobiam = i did not come
 ej šobial = you did not come
 em šoʔ = i will not come
 ellǝ šoʔ = you will not come
Word formation

Factitive verbs have the ending aa: ešši 'child': eššā = make children.

Deverbal nouns have the ending (ǝ)š: am- 'eat': amǝš 'food'.

Instrumental nouns have the ending (p)zan or (p)zǝn: kaj = close, kajzan = lid.

Syntax 
Kamassian was a nominative type language, and the common structure of a Kamassian sentence includes the subject, the object, the adverbial modifier, and a predicate. The subject is in the nominative case. The indefinite object is often expressed by using the nominative but the definite object with the accusative case. The adverbial modifier can also be expressed with adverbs or nouns in the form of local or instrumental cases. The predicate in Kamassian can be preceded by gerundial verb forms, which indicates the manner or tense of an action that is expressed by the predicate. Composite sentences are not used in the Kamassian language. Instead of sentences which are complex Kamassian uses simple sentences with gerundial verbal constructions in which case it has no need to use conjunctions or a sequence of several simple sentences. In Kamassian the subject and predicate must both agree in the person and in number.

Words which typically are used in attributive positions: (demonstrative pronouns, pronominal adjectives, and numerals) can also function as argument expressions. There are also no prepositions in Kamassian, instead postpositions are used and the head of a postposition, usually is marked with a genitive (-ǝn/-n). However, there are also primary postpositions which can govern the lative case. The word order in Kamassian is SOV (subject-object-verb), but the word order VO occurs when using an imperative. Clauses which introduce a situation, the locative adverbial often precedes the subject. In clauses which a new subject appears in a place which is given there is a reverse order. In Kamassian the third person, zero copula predication varies with the usage of the verb i- 'be'. Kamassian direct objects are subject to differential object agreement and to differential object marking. Subordinating conjunctions in Kamassian are kamǝn 'when' and paka 'while', which is a borrowing from Russian (пока).

References

Citations

Sources 

 Britannica, 1984 Edition, Vol. 18, p. 1025.
 Wixman, Ronald. The Peoples of the USSR. p. 109.

External links 
Kamassian-English glossary
M. Alexander Castrén's extensive book on the Samoyed grammar, including Kamassian (in German)
Kamassian dictionary and grammar book
Kamassian e-learning
Kamassian corpus (Audio recordings of Kamass native speakers)
Kamassian Encyclopedia on Miraheze
 Kamas DoReCo corpus compiled by Valentin Gusev, Tiina Klooster, Beáta Wagner-Nagy and Alexandre Arkhipov. Audio recordings of narrative texts with transcriptions time-aligned at the phone level, translations, and time-aligned morphological annotations.

Southern Samoyedic languages
Extinct languages of Asia
Languages of Russia
Languages extinct in the 1980s